This is a list of members of the Western Australian Legislative Council from 22 May 1928 to 21 May 1930. The chamber had 30 seats made up of ten provinces each electing three members, on a system of rotation whereby one-third of the members would retire at each biennial election.

Notes
 On 28 November 1929, Metropolitan-Suburban Province Nationalist MLC Athelstan Saw died. Nationalist candidate Charles Nathan won the resulting by-election on 11 January 1930.
 On 24 April 1930, East Province Country MLC Charles Baxter was appointed Minister for Country Water Supplies and Trading Concerns in the new Ministry led by Sir James Mitchell. He was therefore required to resign and contest a ministerial by-election, at which he was returned unopposed on 1 May 1930.
 On 24 February 1930, North-East Province Labor MLC John Reid Brown died. The seat remained vacant until the 1930 elections on 10 May.

Sources
 
 
 

Members of Western Australian parliaments by term